Krasnooktyabrskoye is a rural locality (a selo) in Novokokhanovsky Selsoviet, Kizlyarsky District, Republic of Dagestan, Russia. The population was 1,807 as of 2010. There are 11 streets.

Geography 
Krasnooktyabrskoye is located 7 km southwest of Kizlyar (the district's administrative centre) by road. Novokokhanovskoye and Krasny Voskhod are the nearest rural localities.

Nationalities 
Avars, Dargins, Russians, Lezgins and Tabasarans live there.

References 

Rural localities in Kizlyarsky District